The 1955 Ball State Cardinals football team was an American football team that represented Ball State Teachers College (later renamed Ball State University) in the Indiana Collegiate Conference (ICC) during the 1955 college football season. In their third and final season under head coach George Serdula, the Cardinals compiled a 3–5 record (1–5 against ICC opponents), tied for last place out of seven teams in the ICC, and were outscored by a total of 144 to 97.

Schedule

References

Ball State
Ball State Cardinals football seasons
Ball State Cardinals football